Queenston may refer to:

Places
 Queenston, a town in Ontario, Canada
 Queenston Road or Queenston Street, part of Ontario Highway 8
 Lewiston–Queenston Bridge or Queenston Bridge
 Queenston Formation, a geological formation of Upper Ordovician age that outcrops in Ontario and New York
 Queenston Delta, a clastic wedge of sediment deposited over eastern North America during the late Ordovician period

Military
 Battle of Queenston Heights or Battle of Queenston, a battle hear the town of Queenston
 Queenston-class, a ship class in the Joint Support Ship Project
 , a Queenston-class naval auxiliary

Animals
 Queenston Stakes, Canadian thoroughbred race

See also 

 Queenston Heights, a promontory near Queenston, Ontario
 Queenstown (disambiguation)
 Queensborough (disambiguation)